The 1997 Idaho Vandals football team represented the University of Idaho in the 1997 NCAA Division I-A football season. The Vandals, led by third-year head coach Chris Tormey, were members of the Big West Conference and played their home games at the Kibbie Dome, an indoor facility on campus in Moscow, Idaho. Idaho was 5–6 overall and 2–3 in conference play.

Idaho's 21-game winning streak at home in the Kibbie Dome came to and end with a blowout loss to bowl-bound  the Vandals also lost at home to rival Boise State in the season finale, only the second loss to BSU in the last sixteen meetings.

For the first time since 1981, Idaho finished with a losing record. Before the fifteen-year run (1982–96), the previous school record for consecutive winning seasons was only three (1903–05), followed by four other times at two (1910–11, 1920–21, 1923–24, 1937–38).

Schedule

References

External links
Gem of the Mountains: 1998 University of Idaho yearbook – 1997 football season
Idaho Argonaut – student newspaper – 1997 editions

Idaho
Idaho Vandals football seasons
Idaho Vandals football